The discography of Ana Popović, a Serbian blues and blues rock guitarist and singer from Belgrade consists of eight solo studio albums, three live solo albums, one studio album done with her father, and one studio album as part of the group Hush. Although born in Serbia, Yugoslavia, Popović now resides in Los Angeles, California in the US.

Studio albums

Hush
 1995–1998: Hush is Popović's early band before she went solo.

Solo albums
 2001–present

With Milton Popović
 2015: Ana Popović recorded an album with her father.

Live albums

Video releases

Hometown album listing

Personnel

Musicians
 Ana Popović – vocals, guitar, guitar (wah), slide guitar
 Rade Popović – guitar, backing vocals
 Milan Sarić – bass
 Bojan Ivković – drums
 Petar Miladinović – harmonica (guest)
 Vojno Dizdar – piano, organ (guest)
 Predrag Krstić – trumpet (guest)

Production
 Aleksandar Radosavljević – production and recording at Studio Akademija, Yugoslavia
 Velja Mijanović – mastering and post-production engineering at VELJAM Studio
 Nikola Vranjković – recording
 Miloš Bičanski – photography

References

Blues discographies
Rock music discographies
Discographies of Serbian artists